Brewcaria is a genus of plants in the family Bromeliaceae. The genus is named for Charles Brewer-Carías, Venezuelan explorer and naturalist. Some authorities treat Brewcaria as a synonym of Navia. It contains 6 known species, all native to Colombia and Venezuela.

Species 

Six species are currently recognised: 

Brewcaria brocchinioides (L.B.Sm.) B.Holst  - Amazonas of Venezuela
Brewcaria duidensis L.B.Sm., Steyerm. & H.Rob.  - Amazonas of Venezuela
Brewcaria hechtioides (L.B.Sm.) B.Holst  - Amazonas of Venezuela
Brewcaria hohenbergioides (L.B.Sm.) B.Holst  - Amazonas of Venezuela
Brewcaria marahuacae L.B.Sm., Steyerm. & H.Rob.  - Amazonas of Venezuela
Brewcaria reflexa (L.B.Sm.) B.Holst - Colombia and Venezuela

References

External links
BSI Genera Gallery photos

 
Bromeliaceae genera
Flora of South America